David Owen (Dewi Wyn o Eifion) (1784 – 17 January 1841) was a Welsh poet and farmer. He is noted for developing two traditional Welsh verse forms: the awdl and the englyn.

Conversion
A dispute over an award, between him and members of the Gwyneddigion Society, led to him largely give up poetry in 1823, although he did resume it in 1832. He had long been drawn to the Baptist faith and converted to it a year before he died.

References

Welsh-language poets
Welsh-language writers
Welsh farmers
Welsh Baptists
People from Gwynedd
1784 births
1841 deaths
19th-century Baptists